Everything Changes is a 2014 album by American folk singer Peggy Seeger. It is Peggy's 22nd album and was released on September 1, 2014 by Signet Music.

Recording
Although Seeger was 79 when it was made, it is the first solo album which Seeger has recorded with a band (rather than solo or as a duo). Musicians included Calum and Neil MacColl, her sons with her late husband Ewan MacColl. One track, "Swim To The Star", was commissioned by the BBC for a program about the sinking of the Titanic.

Critical reaction

Metacritic rates it 79/100 from 5 reviews. Robin Denislow in The Guardian gave it 5/5, calling it "a revelation". The Guardian also rated it number 35 in their best albums of 2014. The Financial Times gave it 4/5, praising the "impeccable musical backing". The Daily Telegraph praised it for dealing with difficult subjects and "keeping up with the times", scoring it 3/5.  Music OHM gave it 5 stars.

Seeger and Calum MacColl won the BBC Radio 2 Folk Award for Original Song of the Year in 2015 for "Swim To The Star".

Track listing

References

2014 albums
Folk albums by American artists